Gordonia paraffinivorans is a bacterium from the genus Gordonia which has been isolated from the Daqing Oil Field in China. Gordonia paraffinivorans has the ability to degrade hydrocarbon.

References

Further reading

External links 
Type strain of Gordonia paraffinivorans at BacDive -  the Bacterial Diversity Metadatabase

Mycobacteriales
Bacteria described in 2003